Thekkinkadu Maidanam is situated in the middle of Thrissur city of Kerala state in India. This hillock which seats the Vadakkumnathan Temple, is an open ground in the centre of the Thrissur city which is under the custody of the Cochin Devaswom Board (CDB). It hosts the spectacular cultural festival Thrissur Pooram, which is considered the Mother of all Poorams in Kerala.

History
Thekkinkadu Maidan was a dense forest in olden days. All kinds of wild animals used to roam in the forest where wanted criminals of Thrissur were executed. The soldiers used to push the criminals in to dense forest from one of the Vadakkumnatha Temple gates. Later, Maharaja of Cochin, Rama Varma Sakthan Thampuran cleared the Thekkinkadu Maidan despite the resistance of Brahmin priests and other orthodox section of people. Till 1970, there were no teaks in the Maidan. In the 1970s Cochin Devaswom Board planted some teaks trees.
Till 1928, the Thekkinkadu Maidan was with the Sanitary Board. In 1928 it was handed over to Thrissur Municipality when it was formed. In 1934, Diwan Paruvakad Narayanan Nair gave the Maidan to Cochin Devaswom Board. The only condition for the transfer was that any organisation can organise meeting or festival without any problem.

Structure
It houses Vadakkunnathan Temple, Nehru Park, Thrissur, Kerala Water Authority office and water storage tanks and seven wells. The whole of the city branches from Thekkinkadu Maidan through nine roads, including most of the important roads like the M.G road and the M.O road. These roads further form junctions to make the spread of the city a circular one.

Activities
A wide range of activities are visible. There are many card players and chess players in the maidan in the evening. Political debates also take place here every day. Students Corner, Labour Corner and Nehru Mandapam are the famous spots where historical events had taken place. Famous people like Mahatma Gandhi, Jawaharlal Nehru, C. Achutha Menon and E. M. S. Namboodiripad have given speeches in the Students Corner. Joseph Vadakkan, a politically active priest held the controversial Holy Mass in the maidan, which led to suspension from the church. It is a major spot for gatherings and festivals in the district, including the Pooram festival and the Thrissur Motor Show (organised by students of Government Engineering College, Thrissur). Nehru Mandapam was named after India's first Prime Minister of India Jawaharlal Nehru when he visited Thrissur city in 1952, and made a speech in Thekkinkadu Maidan. In 1982, Atal Bihari Vajpayee, another Prime Minister of India also gave a speech in Thekkinkadu Maidan.

Prime Ministers of India who visited Thekkinkadu Maidan
 Jawaharlal Nehru
 Indira Gandhi
 Rajiv Gandhi
 Atal Bihari Vajpayee
 Manmohan Singh
 Narendra Modi

References

External links

Maidans in India
Geography of Thrissur
Suburbs of Thrissur city
Tourist attractions in Thrissur